Phyllonorycter chionopa is a moth of the family Gracillariidae. It is known from Namibia. The habitat consists of sandy floodplains and rocky slopes along dry river beds with dominant trees as Acacia montis-usti and Commiphora species.

The length of the forewings is 3 mm. The forewings are elongate and the ground colour is golden yellow with white markings consisting of a broad, irregularly shaped basal streak, two broad, costal, patch-like strigulae, and two dorsal patch-like strigulae. The hindwings are uniformly white. Adults are probably on wing from October to late November or early December.

References

Endemic fauna of Namibia
Moths described in 1961
chionopa
Insects of Namibia
Moths of Africa